Dorota Siudek (née: Zagórska) (born 9 September 1975 in Kraków) is a Polish retired pair skater who is now a coach. Her partner and husband is Mariusz Siudek. They are the 1999 World bronze medalists, two-time (1999, 2000) European silver medalists and two-time (2004, 2007) European bronze medalists. They were the first Polish pair to medal at the World Championships.

Career 
Zagórska was introduced to figure skating by a cousin. After spending her early years as a single skater, she partnered with Janusz Komendera to compete in pairs. They won silver nationally and finished 18th at the 1994 European Championships.

Zagórska teamed up with Mariusz Siudek in 1994. In their first season together, the pair won their national title and were sent to the 1995 European and World Championships, finishing 9th and 16th in their debuts. The following season, they placed 8th in their Champions Series (later renamed Grand Prix) debut at the 1995 Trophée de France.

In the 1997–1998 season, Zagórska / Siudek were 4th at the 1998 European Championships. They finished 10th at their first Olympics, in Nagano, Japan, and ended the season at the 1998 World Championships where they placed 5th.

In 1998–1999, Zagórska / Siudek won their first European medal, silver, at the 1999 European Championships. They went on take bronze at the 1999 World Championships, becoming the first Polish pair to win a World medal.

In the 1999–2000 season, Zagórska / Siudek won their first Grand Prix medals, both bronze, at the 1999 Trophée Lalique and 1999 NHK Trophy and then won another silver medal at the European Championships. The next season, the pair won their third GP medal, also bronze, at the 2000 Cup of Russia but Zagórska's ankle injury led the pair to withdraw from the 2001 Europeans after the short program.

In the 2001–2002 season, Zagórska / Siudek picked up their fourth GP medal, another bronze, at the 2001 NHK Trophy. They withdrew from the 2001 Trophée Lalique after Siudek twisted his knee in the warm-up before the free skate. They competed at their second Olympics, finishing 7th. During the next Grand Prix season, they obtained bronze at the 2002 Bofrost Cup on Ice and silver at the 2002 NHK Trophy.

In spring 2003, Zagórska / Siudek moved to Montreal, Quebec, Canada to work with Richard Gauthier. The pair won bronze medals at the 2003 Skate Canada International and 2003 NHK Trophy and then their third European medal, bronze, at the 2004 European Championships.

In the 2004–2005 season, Zagórska / Siudek added two more bronze medals to their Grand Prix collection at the 2004 Skate Canada International and 2004 NHK Trophy. They had to withdraw from their third GP event, the 2004 Cup of Russia, after Zagórska injured her shoulder in a fall during the short program. The injury also caused them to miss the 2005 Europeans.

In 2005–2006, Zagórska / Siudek took bronze at their two Grand Prix events, the 2005 Cup of Russia and 2005 Cup of China. They finished 9th at their third Olympics.

Although the pair had originally planned to retire after that season, they decided to compete one more season because the 2007 European Championships were assigned to Warsaw, Poland. Zagórska began using her married surname, Siudek, during their final competitive season. The Siudeks won silver at the 2006 Skate America, bringing their GP medal total to 13. In Warsaw, they obtained the bronze medal, marking their fourth podium finish at the European Championships.

The Siudeks withdrew from the 2007 World Championships due to an injury sustained by Mariusz during the long program. The pair announced their competitive retirement following the event. They returned to Poland and began coaching in Toruń. Their former students include Stacey Kemp / David King.

Dorota Siudek is an International Technical Specialist for Poland.

Personal life 
Siudek proposed to Zagórska during the 2000 World Championships, and they were married on 13 May 2000. Their son, Richard, was born on 7 July 2009.

Programs 
(with Siudek)

Results

With Siudek

With Komendera

References

External links 

 Zagórska / Siudek official homepage
 
 Zagórska / Siudek unofficial homepage
 Dorota Siudek / Mariusz Siudek at Tracings.net

1975 births
Living people
Sportspeople from Kraków
Figure skaters at the 1998 Winter Olympics
Figure skaters at the 2002 Winter Olympics
Figure skaters at the 2006 Winter Olympics
Polish female pair skaters
Olympic figure skaters of Poland
International Skating Union technical specialists
Polish figure skating coaches
World Figure Skating Championships medalists
European Figure Skating Championships medalists
Female sports coaches
Universiade medalists in figure skating
Goodwill Games medalists in figure skating
Universiade silver medalists for Poland
Competitors at the 1995 Winter Universiade
Competitors at the 1998 Goodwill Games
Competitors at the 2001 Goodwill Games